This is the Chapter and Colony Roll of the Rho Chi Pharmacy Honor Society as of 24 Jan 2019. An asterisk (*) denotes an inactive chapter.

List of Chapters

References
All chapter locations and designations from The Rho Chi Society's 2012 Bylaws, and list of chapters, accessed 13 June 2014, or the fraternity's website, accessed 24 Jan 2019.

External links
The Rho Chi Society's 2012 Bylaws, and list of chapters
The Rho Chi Society's national website

Lists of chapters of United States student societies by society